This is the results breakdown of the local elections held in Extremadura on 25 May 2003. The following tables show detailed results in the autonomous community's most populous municipalities, sorted alphabetically.

City control
The following table lists party control in the most populous municipalities, including provincial capitals (shown in bold). Gains for a party are displayed with the cell's background shaded in that party's colour.

Municipalities

Almendralejo
Population: 28,030

Badajoz
Population: 136,851

Cáceres
Population: 84,439

Mérida
Population: 50,780

Plasencia
Population: 38,495

See also
2003 Extremaduran regional election

References

Extremadura
2003